Centruroides ochraceus is a species of scorpion in the family Buthidae. It is native to Mexico.

References

Buthidae
Animals described in 1898
Scorpions of North America
Centruroides